Olomana may refer to:

 Olomana, a series mountain peaks on the island of Oahu, Hawaii
 Olomana, a steam locomotive
 Olomana High & Intermediate School